Vitex leucoxylon, the white wood chaste tree, is a species of deciduous woody plant with 15m height, in the family Lamiaceae. Native to Western Ghats of India and Sri Lanka. Bark is brown in color. Leaves compound, digitate; apex acute to obtuse; base cuneate - attenuate; margin entire. Inflorescence is corymbose cymes. Corolla is white with purple color. Fruit is purplish black with four seeded smooth drupe.

Common names
Sinhala - නැබඩ
Tamil - Nir nocchi, Nir-noochi 
Malayalam - Beemis, Vellanotchi, Attunochi, Neernochi, Atta nochii
Marathi - Sona garbi, Sheras 
Telugu - Gajavaavili, Kondavaavili 
Kannada - Holenekki, Sengeni, Hollalakki 
Sanskrit - Paravatapadi

References

External links
General pharmacology of Vitex leucoxylon leaves.
STUDIES ON HEPATOPROTECTIVE ACTIVITY OF VITEX LEUCOXYLON.
Preliminary phytochemical analysis and antibacterial activity of Vitex leucoxylon.

leucoxylon
Flora of the Indian subcontinent